Nayeemul Islam Khan (born 1960), is a media personality in Bangladesh who has been active in Bangladeshi journalism since 1982. He is currently the editor of the Bengali-language daily Amader Orthoneeti and English-language daily The Our Time. He is best known for his introduction of the modern approach of Bengali daily newspapers with the illustrated daily, Ajker Kagoj, launched in 1990. He was also the founding editor of the popular daily Amader Shomoy in 2003. He frequently appears on TV talk-shows since 2007.

Life
Born on 21 January 1958, Nayeemul Islam Khan is from Comilla. He was the eldest among the six children of Nurul Islam Khan, a politician and lawyer, and Nurun Nahar Khan, their mother. He studied at the Comilla Zilla School and passed SSC examination, then went to Dhaka University and obtained his B.A and M.A in Mass Communication & Journalism. He worked with the Bangladesh Center for Development and Journalism. he was briefly 
married to Taslima Nasrin from 1990 to 1991. He later married Nasima Monty. In 2007 he joined the Stamford University, Dhaka as adjunct faculty in the Department of Journalism and Media Studies.

Career in journalism
Nayeemul Islam Khan's debut as an editor was for the short-lived monthly magazine Shomoy that was published for a few months in 1982. His next project was editing Khoborer Kagoj, which made its debut as a weekly in 1987. He is acclaimed as the father of modern approach to the Bengali-language newspaper for his work at Ajker Kahoj, in which he served as editor from its founding 1990 until 1992. In 2002, he re-joined the Ajker Kahoj as advisory editor. That newspaper later closed in 2007. In 1992, he also founded another Bengali-language daily Bhorer Kagoj, which was later edited by Matiur Rahman. Both Ajker Kahoj and Bhorer Kagoj were non-traditional in style and tone. He quit the Bhorer Kagoj in 1992 to run the non-governmental organisation Bangladesh Centre for Development, Journalism and Communication. He made an abortive attempt to publish another daily under the title Notundhara. He also started his own daily, Amader Shomoy in 2007 but was removed as publisher by a court order in 2012. It was a four-page daily that cost TK 2.

Attacked
In 2013, Khan and his wife were returning home from a social event on 11 March when his car, which was clearly marked as a car belonging to the media, was attacked with molotov cocktails, one of which hit the car. He and his wife had to go to the hospital for treatment. The source of the attacks is unknown. The International Federation of Journalists believed he could have been targeted as he had been making frequent television appearances. The Committee to Protect Journalists called for quick investigations and demanded the violence directed against journalists be stopped.

Publications
 Aprotiruddhyo Utthan (Tr. Tale of Ten Undaunted Reporters)
 State of Press Freedom in Bangladesh 2005
 Sangbadpatre Sthaniya Sarkar Bisoye Sera Lekha Sankalan ( A compilation of Best Articles on Local Government in Newspapers)
 Bangladesher Dosh Shohore Sangbadikotai Nari (Tr. Women in Journalism in 10 Towns of Bangladesh)
 Maddhyam 2004 (Tr. Bangladesh Media Directory 2004)
 Sthanio Sarker O Sangbadikota (Tr. Local Government & Journalism)
 Union Parishad Election 2003 in Newspaper
 Nobishi Protibedon
 Gender, Media and Journalism
 Bangladesher Sangbadpatre Smaraniya Protibedan (Tr. Memorable Reports in Bangladesh Newspapers)
 Bangladesh Journalism Review :  Women and Media
 Anusandhani Sangbadikata (Tr. Investigative Journalism)

References

1958 births
Living people
Bangladeshi journalists
Bengali-language writers
Newspaper editors
Newspaper publishers (people)
People from Comilla District
People from Comilla